WWJS-CD, virtual channel 9 (UHF digital channel 15), was a low-powered, Class A independent television station serving Jeffersonville, Indiana, United States that was licensed to Clarksville. The station was locally owned by Dominion Media, Inc. WWJS-CD maintained offices located in Clarksville, and its transmitter was located in Floyds Knobs.

History
The station was founded on May 28, 1985. It first signed on the air in 1989 as W26AS, broadcasting on UHF channel 26. The station changed its call letters to WJYL-LP in 1996, then to WKQT-CA and subsequently to WJYL-CA in 2002, and finally to WNDA-CA in 2009.

In the fall of 2010, the station began to share programming with Louisville-based WKYI-CD (channel 24), its parent station. Shortly before September 2010, the station changed its call sign to WWJS-CA, but retained the WNDA name for branding purposes. Shortly after converting its signal to digital, the station changed its call sign to WWJS-CD, maintaining "WNDA" as a brand (the "-CD" suffix in a station's call sign refers to a Class A low-power station that transmits a digital signal; the previous "-CA" appended implied transmission through analog signals). The station is now WKYI 24.3, though it displays as Channel 9.1 on most televisions.

On April 13, 2017, the Federal Communications Commission (FCC) announced that WWJS-CD had successfully sold its spectrum in the 2016 incentive auction for $9,992,700 without any channel sharing agreement. WKYI's simulcast of 9.1 on 24.5 would likely become the channel's new permanent home, with the other subchannels either moved or wholly discontinued. The station's license was surrendered to and cancelled by the FCC on September 15, 2017.

Digital television

Digital channels
The station's digital channel was multiplexed:

Programming
Syndicated programs broadcast by WWJS-CD included Highway to Heaven, Cold Case Files, Crook and Chase, The Andy Griffith Show and The Beverly Hillbillies. Beginning in January 2015, WNDA Channel 9 picked up the syndicated programming previously shown on its parent station (WKYI 24.1), such as Da Vinci's Inquest. WNDA aired some of the programming from This TV that was not being aired on WKYI, such as In the Heat of the Night and some of This TV's movies that were not aired on WKYI. WKYI 24.1 continued to air other syndicated and local programming in addition to This TV programming.

Newscasts
In January 2006, the station debuted a local newscast known as Indiana 9 News, which was produced by Independent News Network out of Davenport, Iowa. Stories were gathered by local reporters and then presented by anchors in Davenport, along with weather and sports segments. This program was cancelled in 2013, replaced by a rebroadcast of ABC affiliate WHAS-TV's (channel 11) 6 p.m. newscast that aired weeknights at 7 p.m. The station continued to air Independent News Network's national newscast at 7:30 p.m. weeknights but that was discontinued in late 2014. In addition, the station carried the local newsmagazine program The Louisville Daily and a business discussion program Inside Indiana Business.

References

External links 

WJS-CD
Low-power television stations in the United States
Independent television stations in the United States
Television channels and stations established in 1993
1993 establishments in Indiana
Television channels and stations disestablished in 2017
2017 disestablishments in Indiana
Defunct television stations in the United States
Defunct mass media in Indiana